Pablo Andres Salazar Sánchez (born 21 November 1982) is a retired Costa Rican footballer, who played as a centre back. He is currently the assistant manager of Herediano.

Club career
He started his professional debut at Santa Barbara and also played for Cartaginés, Alajuelense, Municipal Liberia, Universidad de Costa Rica before joining Herediano in summer 2011. In February 2015, he signed with Mérida.

On 3 June 2019 it was confirmed, that Salazar had decided to retire and would continue at Herediano as assistant manager.

International career
Salazar has played at the 2001 FIFA World Youth Championship and competed for Costa Rica at the 2004 Summer Olympics.

He made his senior debut for Costa Rica in a November 2005 friendly match against France and has, as of 14 November 2014, earned a total of 6 caps, scoring no goals. He received a call-up to the national team as it prepared for the 2009 CONCACAF Gold Cup, replacing injured defender Michael Umaña but only won his second cap 7 years after his debut when he played at the 2013 Copa Centroamericana.

References

External links
 
 

1982 births
Living people
Association football defenders
Liga FPD players
Costa Rican footballers
Costa Rica international footballers
Olympic footballers of Costa Rica
Footballers at the 2004 Summer Olympics
2009 CONCACAF Gold Cup players
2013 Copa Centroamericana players
2014 Copa Centroamericana players
2017 Copa Centroamericana players
C.S. Cartaginés players
L.D. Alajuelense footballers
Municipal Liberia footballers
C.F. Universidad de Costa Rica footballers
C.S. Herediano footballers
Copa Centroamericana-winning players